Niagara Airport may refer to airports/airfields within the Buffalo-Niagara Falls metro area, of New York State, USA, and Ontario, Canada:

In the US
Buffalo Niagara International Airport (IATA: BUF, ICAO: KBUF)
Niagara Falls International Airport (IATA: IAG, ICAO: KIAG, FAA LID: IAG)
Niagara Falls Air Reserve Station, a US Air Force Base located adjacent to Niagara Falls International Airport

In Canada
St. Catharines/Niagara District Airport (IATA: YCM, ICAO: CYSN) 
Niagara Central Dorothy Rungeling Airport or Welland/Niagara Central Dorothy Rungeling Aerodrome, (TC LID: CNQ3)
Niagara Falls/Niagara South Airport, (TC LID: CNF9)